Tele Arena is an Italian regional television channel of Veneto owned by Athesis. It transmits a light entertainment program: movies, news and weather bulletins, film and sports on LCN 16.

Other channels of own group are Telearena News and Tele Arena Sport.

Programs in Italian 
Vie Verdi
Telegiornale
Diretta gialloblù
Obiettivo dillettanti
A tutta B
Palla lunga e pedalare
Tuttodilletanti
Lunedì nel pallone
Che aria tira
Volley Veronese
Pianeta D

References

External links

Telearena - massimoemanuelli.com 

Television channels in Italy
Television channels and stations established in 1979
Free-to-air
Italian-language television networks